Larch is an unincorporated community in Delta County, in the U.S. state of Michigan.

History
The community was named from a grove of American larch near the original town site.

References

Unincorporated communities in Delta County, Michigan